John Peter "Jack" Condon (9 May 1922 – 9 October 2015) was an Australian rules footballer who played with Geelong in the Victorian Football League (VFL).

VFL career
Condon was born in Hamilton, but recruited locally to Geelong, from the St Mary's club. Following a premiership with the seconds in 1948, he made his senior debut for Geelong in the 1949 VFL season as a mature recruit, two weeks shy of his 27th birthday. Condon, who worked off the field as a fireman, quickly became Geelong's regular ruckman. Described as a "good battler", he won the club's "best first year player" award for 1949. He played 14 of a possible 19 games that year, with a suspension for attempting to strike Footcray's Dick Wearmouth costing him four weeks.

In 1950, Condon made 17 league appearances. He showed his capabilities as a forward when he kicked eight goals in Geelong's 33-point win over Footscray at Kardinia Park in round two. His final game for Geelong was the 1950 preliminary final loss to North Melbourne, when they gave up a 39-point quarter time lead. He kicked two goals in the 17-point loss.

Coaching
He accepted an offer in the 1951 pre-season to be playing coach of Portland in the Western District Football League. They finished runners-up in Condon's first season as coach, then in 1952 he steered the club to their first premiership in the league, with a six-point grand final win over Hamilton, which were led by former Melbourne player Fred Fanning. Portland were losing preliminary finalists under Condon in 1953 and 1954.

References

External links

1922 births
Australian rules footballers from Victoria (Australia)
Geelong Football Club players
Portland Football Club players
St Mary's Sporting Club Inc players
2015 deaths
People from Hamilton, Victoria
Australian Army personnel of World War II
Australian Army soldiers